Randall Y. Iwase (born December 1, 1947) is an American politician and former Hawaii State Senator. In 2006 he announced his candidacy for the Hawaii Democratic Party's nomination for Governor of Hawaii.

He ran on a platform emphasizing reform in the education sector, citing his beliefs in the importance of universal education learned from his own working-class background. The popular incumbent Republican governor defeated Iwase by a substantial margin, in spite of a favorable Democratic climate in 2006.

Early years
Randy Iwase was born in Honolulu.  His mother was divorced and because of financial hardship in Hawai'i just after World War II, moved to the Island of Hawai'i to live with Randy's Big Island grandparents.

Later, his family moved back to an Ala Moana Boulevard, Honolulu, and lived with his other grandparents in relative hardship.

He attended and graduated from Kaimuki High School.

After high school he attended the University of Hawaii at Manoa during a time of optimism and technological advancements. Iwase earned his bachelor's degree with honors, there. He applied to and attended the University of San Francisco School of Law and earned his Juris Doctor degree.

Iwase married his wife Jan in 1977 and has three sons Justin, Jarand, and Jordan.

Career
Randy Iwase returned to Hawai'i with his JD degree and worked as a deputy attorney general and also served as Majority Floor Leader, Hawai'i State Senator (Majority Whip), and executive director of the Aloha Tower Development Corp.

2006 gubernatorial race
Iwase won the Democratic primary by a substantial margin without serious opposition and faced Republican incumbent Governor Linda Lingle.

Only one debate occurred in the duration of the campaign, giving the relatively unknown Iwase statewide television exposure.

According to filings with the Hawai'i state Campaign Spending Commission, the Iwase campaign had only raised $241,973 as of September 23, 2006.  This was in contrast to a record $6.37 million raised by his opponent, Governor Linda Lingle. The large difference in available funds was cited as an insurmountable obstacle for Iwase.

Instead, the Iwase campaign focused on using Internet technology. In addition to a classic webpage with campaign press releases and schedules, it featured videos, online contributions, links, a discussion/feedback board, blogs, as well as an RSS/Atom newsfeed.

Randy Iwase was defeated by over twenty-five points, 63 percent to 35 percent, in the general election, as Governor Lingle's personal popularity and well funded media campaign overwhelmed Iwase.  His campaign's financial difficulties and late start offset the congressional Democratic "wave" of 2006.

References

External links
 Campaign website

1947 births
Hawaii politicians of Japanese descent
Democratic Party Hawaii state senators
Living people
Politicians from Honolulu
University of Hawaiʻi at Mānoa alumni
University of San Francisco alumni